James E. Held (February 16, 1938 – October 15, 1967) was an American attorney and politician who served as a member of the Wisconsin State Assembly for the 18th district from 1966 until his death in 1967.

Early life and education
Held was born in Racine, Wisconsin. He graduated from St. Catherine's High School, Marquette University, and the Georgetown University Law Center.

Career 
Held practiced law and worked for the Milwaukee County Executive office. Held was elected to the Assembly representing the Wisconsin's 18th Assembly district from 1966 until his death. He was a Republican.

Personal life 
Held was killed in an accident in Milwaukee County, Wisconsin, on October 15, 1967 when his car struck a parked tow truck.

References

Politicians from Racine, Wisconsin
Republican Party members of the Wisconsin State Assembly
Marquette University alumni
Georgetown University Law Center alumni
Wisconsin lawyers
1938 births
1967 deaths
20th-century American lawyers
Road incident deaths in Wisconsin
20th-century American politicians